TU Corvi is a yellow-white hued star in the southern constellation of Corvus. It is a dimly visible to the naked eye with an apparent visual magnitude of 6.20. Based upon measured changes in its proper motion, it may be a close binary system.

This is an F-type main-sequence star with a stellar classification of F0 V. Previously it had been classed as F0 III, matching an evolved giant star. It is a Delta Scuti variable, varying by an amplitude of 0.025 in B magnitude with a period of 118 minutes. At the age of 786 million years, it has a high rate of spin with a projected rotational velocity of 103 km/s. The star has 1.45 times the mass of the Sun and is radiating 12.6 times the Sun's luminosity from its photosphere at an effective temperature of 7,132 K.

References

F-type main-sequence stars
Delta Scuti variables
Corvus (constellation)
Durchmusterung objects
109585 
061496 
4797
Corvi, TU